Senador Amaral is the second highest city in Brazil, reaching near  in some parts in the northern areas, nearly the Ponte Segura district, the highest point is an unnamed mount in Bom Repouso border at approximately  above sea level.  It is located in the Mantiqueira Mountains, south of Minas Gerais state. It is a small city, with a population of 5,361 inhabitants and approximately 2980 people living in the urban area. There was no asphalt or mobile phone signal in the municipality before 2007. Only Cambuí access, MG-295 is asphalted.

Climate 

Distances
Some distances from surrounding and major cities:
  from Cambuí (and the federal highway BR-381)
  from Camanducaia
  from Extrema
  from Bragança Paulista
  from Munhoz
  from Bom Repouso
  from Pouso Alegre
  from Campos do Jordão
  from Campinas
  from Poços de Caldas
  from Três Corações
  from Resende
  from Rio de Janeiro
  from Belo Horizonte
  from São Paulo.

See also
 Campos do Jordão
 Cambuí
 Mantiqueira Mountains

Footnotes

External links
 senadoramaral.mg.gov.br 
 bussolanet.com.br 

Municipalities in Minas Gerais